Mika Väyrynen (born 28 December 1981) is a Swedish-born Finnish former footballer.

Club career

Early career
Väyrynen started his career with FC Lahti and joined FC Jokerit for the 2001 season.

Heerenveen
Midway through that year SC Heerenveen beat Internazionale to his signature, Väyrynen opting for the Dutch club in order to have a better chance of a regular starting place. He immediately broke into the Heerenveen side, though the switch from a summer to winter season meant he began to suffer from injury problems. However, in 2003–04 he became their key player in midfield, and ended up scoring 17 goals in 100 Eredivisie games.

PSV
In the summer of 2005, Väyrynen joined PSV, upon joining stating, "PSV is the best option for me. At Heerenveen I learned to play more simple football. I am not the player I was in Finland any more, tactically and physically especially I have grown a lot." He was brought in to replace Mark van Bommel by PSV manager Guus Hiddink. Väyrynen was, however, ruled out for much of the early 2005–06 season with an ankle injury. Väyrynen returned to action as a substitute on 17 December 2005 against Willem II, and immediately scored his first goal for PSV. He was not able to earn a regular starting place in the spring season, and mostly made substitute appearances, as PSV secured the Dutch title for the second year in a row.

Väyrynen was linked with a move to Rangers and newly promoted Premier League side Derby County as they looked to strengthen for the 2007–08 season. Väyrynen almost moved to Derby in August 2007, but the move collapsed because of a calf injury.

In the summer of 2008, Väyrynen was again linked with Rangers and an undisclosed Belgian team, believed to be Club Brugge.  He was also linked with Derby for the second time on 22 July 2008, according to Derby's local radio, despite their relegation to the Championship.

Heerenveen
31 August 2008, two days before the closing of the transfer window, Väyrynen was signed by former club Heerenveen to a contract until 2011 with an option of one year more. He picked up a knee injury in a January 2009 match against Ajax which ruled him out of play until the end of 2009. In his final season at Heerenveen, he scored 9 league goals for the club in 30 games.

Leeds United
On 13 September 2011, Väyrynen, now a free agent, signed a one-year deal – with an option of a further year – with English Championship side Leeds United. Väyrynen was rumoured to have been on the verge of signing Austrian club Red Bull Salzburg at the time Leeds came in for him.

In signing for Leeds, Väyrynen joined compatriot Mikael Forssell at Elland Road. Väyrynen made his first appearance in a Leeds squad on 20 September, he was named on the bench against rivals Manchester United, and was brought on with Forssell in the 52nd minute. Väyrynen made his league debut as a substitute in the 3–3 draw against Brighton & Hove Albion on 23 September, coming on for the last nine minutes. He made his Elland Road league debut against Portsmouth on 1 October, coming on as a second-half substitute in a 1-0 win. He made his first start for Leeds on 22 October, coming into the side for the injured Robert Snodgrass against Peterborough United.

Väyrynen was ruled out for a few weeks when he had groin surgery which also ruled him out of some of the international fixtures with Finland.
 He returned as a substitute for Leeds against Watford on 10 December, and he made an immediate impact when he won an injury time penalty for Leeds to equalise. His second start came in Leeds 4–1 loss against Barnsley on 31 December 2011.

On 16 April, Leeds united terminated Väyrynen's contract by mutual consent after eight months at the club.

HJK Helsinki
Since leaving Leeds, Väyrynen had been training with HJK Helsinki in order to maintain match fitness. On 10 July, HJK announced that Väyrynen had signed a three-month contract with the club. He made his debut one week later, scoring from a penalty, in a 7−0 home win against KR Reykjavik in UEFA Champions League qualifiers. He made in total of 12 league appearances, scoring three goals, as HJK were crowned as league champions for the fourth consecutive season.

On 1 February 2013, Väyrynen signed a two-year contract extension with HJK.

LA Galaxy
In February 2015, Väyrynen trialed with LA Galaxy of Major League Soccer and signed with them on 6 March 2015. On 15 March 2015, he made his debut against the Portland Timbers, coming off the bench in the 62nd minute and replacing Baggio Hušidić in an eventual 2–2 draw.

International career
Väyrynen was a key player for the Finland national team. He made his debut on 20 March 2002 against South Korea. Väyrynen's breakthrough for Finland came in June 2003, when he was the star performer in matches against Serbia and Montenegro and Italy. Väyrynen was also a key player for Finland at the 2001 FIFA World Youth Championship.

Career stats

Club

International

International goals
Finland's score first.

Honours

PSV
Eredivisie: 2005–06, 2006–07

ScHeerenveen
KNVB Cup: 2009

HJK
Veikkausliiga: 2012, 2013, 2014
Finnish Cup: 2014

Individual
Veikkausliiga Team of the Year: 2016

References

External links

 
 
 
 
 
 
 
 
 

1981 births
Living people
People from Eskilstuna
Finnish footballers
Finland youth international footballers
Finland international footballers
Association football midfielders
FC Lahti players
FC Jokerit players
SC Heerenveen players
PSV Eindhoven players
Leeds United F.C. players
Helsingin Jalkapalloklubi players
LA Galaxy players
HIFK players
Veikkausliiga players
Eredivisie players
English Football League players
Major League Soccer players
Finnish expatriate footballers
Expatriate footballers in the Netherlands
Finnish expatriate sportspeople in the Netherlands
Expatriate footballers in England
Expatriate soccer players in the United States